1K ZX Chess is a 1982 chess program for the unexpanded Sinclair ZX81.

Description
1K ZX Chess'''s code takes up only 672 bytes in memory, but implements chess rules except for castling, promotion, and en passant, including a computer opponent. It was the smallest implementation of chess on any computer, although today that title is held by ChesSkelet with 269 bytes (less than half the size of 1K ZX Chess).
Developer David Horne discussed 1K ZX Chess and published the full source code as a type-in program in a series of articles in Your Computer in 1982 and 1983.

ReceptionPopular Computing Weekly in 1982 called 1K ZX Chess "one of the most interesting ZX tapes to pass through our office in recent weeks". It approved of the computer displaying moves while considering them and noted "the skills which went into writing a chess program in 1K of machine code. Is there anyone reading this who could even contemplate doing the same?" The magazine concluded, "Despite the limitations this is one cassette, at £3, which I would recommend." Sinclair User in 1983 stated that "it takes some technical wizardry to squeeze this kind of game into the unexpanded ZX81". The magazine praised the game's quick loading speed, and found that it "makes its moves very fast for the amount of memory available for it". Home Computing Weekly gave the game three out of five stars, criticizing the confusing user interface but stating that "it still produces play which needs some thought to beat". Tim Harding wrote in a 1985 book on computer chess that "the man who did it must be some sort of genius". While describing 1K ZX Chess quality of play as "so appalling that it would be hard to make it beat you" and criticizing the backward algebraic notation, he concluded that "the program is nevertheless a fantastic technical achievement".1K ZX Chess came in second place for best software in a poll of ZX81 users. Retrogaming Times Monthly described it as "history's greatest game programming feat";  BootChess author Olivier Poudade praised 1K ZX Chess''s code, stating that at first writing a smaller chess program "seemed impossible ... Horne had nailed it so much already". Poudade acknowledged replicating some of Horne's methods as he could not improve them.

See also
Microchess

References

External links
Full ZX-81 Chess in 1K
1K ZX Chess at Chess Programming Wiki
1K ZX Chess ZX81 Collection entry with the original inlay scan and program listing.  An emulator is available on the site to play the game online.

1982 video games
Chess software
ZX81 games
Commercial video games with freely available source code
Video games developed in the United Kingdom